"How to Be a Girl" is a single written and produced by Tetsuya Komuro and performed by Namie Amuro. It was released on May 21, 1997.

Track listing
"How to Be a Girl – Straight Run"
"How to Be a Girl – Adult Education Mix"
"How to Be a Girl – Instrumental"

Personnel
 Namie Amuro – vocals

Production
 Producer – Tetsuya Komuro

TV performances
 May 16, 1997 – Music Station
 May 24, 1997 – PopJam
 May 24, 1997 – CDTV
 May 30, 1997 – Music Station
 May 31, 1997 – PopJam
 June 9, 1997 – Hey! Hey! Hey!
 June 24, 1997 – Utaban

Charts
Oricon Sales Chart (Japan)

Oricon Sales Chart (Japan)

Namie Amuro songs
1997 singles
Oricon Weekly number-one singles
Songs written by Tetsuya Komuro
1997 songs
Avex Trax singles